was a Japanese gymnast. He competed in eight events at the 1936 Summer Olympics.

References

External links
 

1915 births
Year of death missing
Japanese male artistic gymnasts
Olympic gymnasts of Japan
Gymnasts at the 1936 Summer Olympics
Place of birth missing